Federico Gay may refer to:

 Federico Gay (cyclist) (born 1896), Italian road bicycle racer
 Federico Gay (footballer) (born 1991), Argentine defender